The Standard Color Reference of America (and its supplement the U.S. Army Color Card) is a book of reference fabric swatches of different colors produced by The Color Association of the United States (CAUS), each color specified by “cable number” (and therefore sometimes known as cable colors). Until its 10th edition in 1981, the guide was called the Standard Color Card of America, and until 1955 the CAUS was called The Textile Color Card Association of the United States (TCCA). Thus, the guide was often referred to as the TCCA Color Card.

Among other uses, the American national flag and many state flags are officially specified based on the Standard Color Reference, as are those of a handful of other countries, such as the Philippines.

References

Textile industry of the United States
Color